The Falcon's Brother is a 1942 American crime drama film in which George Sanders, who had been portraying "The Falcon" in a series of films, appears with his real-life brother Tom Conway; with Sanders handing off the series to Conway, who would play the new Falcon in nine subsequent films.  Jane Randolph was featured in a supporting role. The Falcon's Brother, the only one to feature two Falcons, was directed by Stanley Logan.

Plot
Sleuth Gay Lawrence (George Sanders), known as "The Falcon," with his assistant, "Lefty" (Don Barclay), arrive at dockside to meet a Latin American cruise ship. On board is Lawrence's brother, Tom (Tom Conway) who is pronounced dead, a victim of suicide, by homicide inspector Timothy Donovan (Cliff Clark). Diane Medford (Gwili Andre), Tom's shipboard companion offers sympathy, but Lawrence has Lefty tail her, as he already knew the body in the cabin was not his brother.

Tracking Diane to a fashion show at the salon of her employer Madame Arlette (Charlotte Wynters), Diane is greeted by her fiancé, fashion editor Paul Harrington (James Newill). Two other ship passengers, Latin American dancers Carmela (Amanda Varela) and Valdez (George J. Lewis) are there. Reporter Marcia Brooks (Jane Randolph) recognizes the Falcon, who follows Diane into her office. A shot rings out and Diane falls dead. The Falcon runs into the alley behind the salon and encounters his brother, Tom.

Inspector Donovan arrives at the scene and arrests Lefty while the Falcon is run down by a speeding car. Tom takes his unconscious brother to his apartment, where Marcia seeks information about the murder. Lefty is released with a suspended sentence, and learns that his boss will soon recover. Marcia informs Tom that the murder weapon is missing, prompting Tom to return to Arlette's salon to investigate.

Seeing Arlette at a nightclub, Tom informs her that the police have the gun from the murder scene and are tracing its serial number. Arlette phones the Police Inspector and gives them Tom's whereabouts. Tom and Lefty search Arlette's, where they find the missing gun hidden in a mannequin. Donovan tracks them down at the salon, and when Tom introduces himself, the inspector arrests him for false impersonation, believing Tom Lawrence is dead.

After proving his identity, Tom is freed and directs Marcia to investigate Harrington's photographer, Savitski (Andre Charlot). Tom confronts Arlette with the gun, forcing her to admit that she hid the weapon to protect her love, Harrington who denies murdering Diane and is exonerated by a ballistics expert. Marcia discovers that Savitski is an illegal alien. After smoking a cigar, and about to reveal a clue about mass murders to Tom and Lefty, Savitski falls dead, dropping a pile of magazines.

Deducing that Savitski was killed by a poisoned cigar, the same way the suicide victim on the ship, was killed, Tom instructs Lefty to pose as the photographer when Valdez and Carmela enter his office with guns drawn. When Tom steps out of the shadows, the pair identify themselves as Mexican counter-espionage agents and explain that Diane was killed because she knew too much. After Tom notifies Donovan of Savitski's murder, he brings back the photographer's magazines. Certain that Harrington is involved in the murders, Tom and Lefty realize a magazine cover dated December 7, prophesying the Pearl Harbor attack and another magazine cover indicates an incident will take place that day at a Long Island inn.

Tom and Marcia speed off to stop the sabotage, while The Falcon regains consciousness and joins Lefty on a trip to Long Island where German agents have been preparing for an attack, and Harrington is one of them. After capturing Tom and Marcia and locking them in a bell tower, the agents go ahead with their plan to assassinate a Latin American envoy as his aircraft lands. Tom manages to ring the bell, just as his brother steps in front of the diplomat, sacrificing his own life for that of an ally. With the spy ring smashed, Tom takes up where his brother left off, becoming the new Falcon.

Cast

 George Sanders as Gay Lawrence/The Falcon
 Tom Conway as Tom Lawrence/The Falcon
 Jane Randolph as Marcia Brooks
 Don Barclay as Lefty
 Cliff Clark as Inspector Timothy Donovan
 Edward Gargan as Detective Bates
 Eddie Dunn as Detective Grimes
 Charlotte Wynters as Arlette
 James Newill as Paul Harrington
 Keye Luke as Jerry, Gay's Houseboy
 Amanda Varela as Carmela
 George J. Lewis as Valdez
 Gwili Andre as Diane Medford
 André Charlot as Savitski
 Mary Halsey as Miss Ross
 Charles Arnt as Pat Moffett
 Richard Martin as Steamship official
 Julie Warren as Flashy girl
 Ken Harlan as Torrence
 Andre Marsaudon as Dr. De Sola
 John Dilson as Ship's doctor
 Eddy Chandler as First mate
 Jack Gargan as Steward
 Tommy Tucker as Boy
 Kay Aldridge as Spanish girl/Victory gown model
 Georgia Carroll as Magazine cover girl
 Bonnie Kildare as Miss Honolulu
 Max Waizman as Devlin
 Percy Launders as Arlette's doorman
 Ralph Brooks as Arlette's attendant

Production
In January 1942 Sanders reported he no longer wished to make films in the series.

Although he was being replaced by his elder brother, Tom Conway, Sanders who wanted out of the series,  insisted that his character be killed off in The Falcon's Brother. RKO had wanted to have Sanders star in one more Falcon film with the enticement that having his brother take over the lead role would further his career. In the end, the Conway-starred films did better "business" than the films that featured Sanders. p. 176

Reception
In his review of The Falcon's Brother, Bosley Crowther wrote, in The New York Times, "... in this final encounter of the gay detective with the criminally inclined, Mr. Sanders only opens the snooping and then is conveniently retired while his true (as well as fictional) brother, Tom Conway, takes over the pursuit. And then, in the end, Mr. Sanders is unconditionally killed—killed in heroic line of duty—while Mr. Conway is left to carry on. Thus one Falcon passes, but another is providentially fledged. It is too bad that as much ingenuity as was used to effect this interfraternal switch was not put into the further contrivance of a plot. As it is, "The Falcon's Brother" is just a moderately confusing mystery tale, boasting but three casual murders and the final disposition of Mr. S. Nazi spies, it turns out, are the villains, and that's pretty routine these days. And, ungraciously perhaps, it must be stated that Mr. Conway is only fair as a hero. His voice is like Mr. Sanders's, but his manners are not quite so suave." The Falcon's Brother earned a profit of $128,000.

References

Notes

Citations

Bibliography

 Jewell, Richard B. Slow Fade to Black: The Decline of RKO Radio Pictures. Berkeley, California: University of California Press, 2016. .
 Jewell, Richard and Vernon Harbin. The RKO Story. New Rochelle, New York: Arlington House, 1982. .

External links
 
 
 
 

1942 films
1942 crime drama films
1940s mystery drama films
American crime drama films
American mystery drama films
American black-and-white films
American detective films
Films scored by Roy Webb
Mannequins in films
RKO Pictures films
Films directed by Stanley Logan
The Falcon (film character) films
1940s English-language films
1940s American films